Zahiduzzaman Sagor (born 3 July 1996) is a Bangladeshi cricketer. He made his first-class debut for Dhaka Division in the 2016–17 National Cricket League on 25 September 2016. He made his Twenty20 debut for Brothers Union in the 2018–19 Dhaka Premier Division Twenty20 Cricket League on 26 February 2019. He made his List A debut for Brothers Union in the 2018–19 Dhaka Premier Division Cricket League on 20 March 2019.  Zahiduzzaman made his debut in Bangladesh Premier League for Dhaka Dominators on 7 February 2023.

References

External links
 

1996 births
Living people
Bangladeshi cricketers
Brothers Union cricketers
Dhaka Division cricketers
Place of birth missing (living people)